Manis was a trained orangutan that played Clyde as Clint Eastwood's sidekick in the 1978 box office hit Every Which Way But Loose. Its 1980 sequel, Any Which Way You Can (1980), did not feature Manis, as the "child actor" had grown too much between productions.  In the sequel, two orangutans, C.J. and Buddha, shared the role. Manis also featured in the 1984 action comedy film Cannonball Run II as the 'limo driver'. 

In a documentary produced by People for the Ethical Treatment of Animals (PETA), it was alleged that Manis was beaten on the set by his trainer to keep him docile. The trainer would spray mace in his face and then beat him with an iron pipe wrapped in newspaper. The source for this information was Visions of Caliban, a book by Dale Peterson and Jane Goodall, but Peterson and Goodall actually refer not to Manis but to Buddha, the orangutan used in the second film (which the book mistakenly calls Every Which Way You Can, rather than Any Which Way You Can). The book claims that Buddha was badly beaten by his trainer, who clubbed him with an axe handle, and that an autopsy after his death suggested cerebral hemorrhage. Buddha's crime was stealing doughnuts from the craft service table. The book claims that the second orangutan referred to as being in the film, Clyde Junior or C.J., was brought in for publicity during the marketing of the movie, as a result of Buddha's death. Doubt has been cast on these claims by makeup effects artist William Munns.

Manis returned to working with his trainers' act in Las Vegas.

References

External links 
 

Animal actors
Individual orangutans